Longer Fuse is a 1977 album by Canadian pop singer Dan Hill. It reached number 2 in Canada, and was in the Top 100 for 42 weeks. It was number 7 in the top 100 albums chart for 1978.

Track listing 
All songs written by Dan Hill, unless otherwise stated.
"Sometimes When We Touch" (Dan Hill, Barry Mann) - 4:12
"14 Today" - 4:29
"In the Name of Love" - 2:33
"Crazy" (Dan Hill, Don Potter) - 4:05
"McCarthy's Day" - 3:53
"Jean" - 4:28
"You Are All I See" - 2:20
"Southern California" - 4:10
"Longer Fuse" - 4:20
"Still Not Used To" - 4:25

Personnel 
 Dan Hill – lead vocals, backing vocals (3-6, 8, 9), guitar (5), acoustic guitar (7, 8, 10)
 Bobby Ogdin – acoustic piano (1, 6, 8), Fender Rhodes (2, 3, 4, 9), electric piano (6), organ (8)
 Matthew McCauley – string arrangements (1, 6), synthesizers (2, 5, 6, 7), ARP synthesizer (4), backing vocals (4, 5, 6, 8, 9), string conductor (6), organ (9), cello arrangements (10)
 John Capek – Rhodes piano (5)
 Eric Robertson – Fender Rhodes (10)
 Don Potter – acoustic guitar (1-4, 6-10), string conductor (1), backing vocals (4, 5), guitar (5)
 Bob Mann – electric guitar (1-4, 9), acoustic guitar (2)
 Ben Mink – mandolin (5, 10)
 Tom Szczeniak – bass (1, 3, 4, 9)
 Rick Homme – bass (2, 7)
 Dennis Pendrith – bass (5)
 Bob Boucher – bass (6, 8, 10)
 Larrie Londin – drums (1-4, 6, 8, 9)
 Jørn Andersen – drums (5)
 Fred Mollin – percussion (1-5, 8, 9), acoustic guitar (4, 9), cabasa (4), backing vocals (4, 5, 6, 8, 9)
 Ronald Laurie – cello (10)

Production 
 Matthew McCauley – producer 
 Fred Mollin – producer 
 Bernie Finkelstein – co-producer (5)
 Don Potter – co-producer (5)
 William McCauley – executive producer 
 Andrew Hermant – engineer (1-9)
 Ken Friesen – engineer (10)
 Bob Ludwig – mastering 
 Bart Scholaes – art direction, design, photography
 Recorded at Manta Sound, Eastern Sound and The Cathedral Church of St. James (Toronto, Ontario, Canada).
 Mastered at Masterdisk (New York City, New York, USA).

Charts

References

1977 albums
Dan Hill albums
20th Century Fox Records albums
Juno Award for Album of the Year albums